U, also written Uh, is one of the administrative divisions of Pohnpei State, Federated States of Micronesia. U bears the shortest place name in the Federated States of Micronesia, and one of the shortest in the world.

Description
U is one of the six municipalities located in the main island of Pohnpei. It corresponds to the northeastern sector of the island. U had 2,289 inhabitants according to the 2008 census.

Alohkapw is the main town. A channel known as Kepidewen Alohkapw marks the boundary between U and Madolenihmw municipalities.

Education
Pohnpei State Department of Education operates public schools:
 Awak Elementary School
 Saladak Elementary School

Bailey Olter High School (former Pohnpei Island Central School or PICS) in Kolonia serves students from U.

See also
 Madolenihmw
 Kitti (municipality)
 Sokehs
 Nett
 Kapingamarangi
 Pingelap
 Sapwuahfik
 Nukuoro
 Mokil
 Kolonia
 Oroluk
 Palikir

References

External links
View of Sokehs Rock from U Municipality
U Municipal Government Audit Report 1999

Municipalities of Pohnpei